John Smith was an eighteenth century academic, most notably Vice Chancellor of the University of Cambridge from 1766 until 1767;

Notes

18th-century scholars
Vice-Chancellors of the University of Cambridge
Alumni of St John's College, Cambridge